In mathematical analysis, Agmon's inequalities, named after Shmuel Agmon,  consist of two closely related interpolation inequalities between the Lebesgue space  and the Sobolev spaces .  It is useful in the study of partial differential equations.

Let  where .  Then Agmon's inequalities in 3D state that there exists a constant  such that

 

and

 

In 2D, the first inequality still holds, but not the second: let  where .  Then Agmon's inequality in 2D states that there exists a constant  such that

 

For the -dimensional case, choose  and  such that .

See also

 Ladyzhenskaya inequality
 Brezis–Gallouet inequality

Notes

References
 
 

Theorems in analysis
Inequalities